Edward Perrott (1851–1915) was a rugby union international who represented England in 1875.

Early life
Perrott was born on 16 September 1851 in Bronhyddron, Oswestry, Shropshire, England, the eldest of the eight children of Robert Simcocks Perrott (1813–1888) and Elizabeth Ann Owen. His father had been born in Llansaintffraid, Montgomeryshire, Wales and in 1865 was the High Sheriff of Montgomeryshire. His maternal grandfather was a clergyman and had been the Rector of Penmorfa and also of Llaneddwyn. He attended Cheltenham College.

Rugby union career
Perrott played rugby at Cheltenham College and went on to represent the old boys side, Old Cheltonians, as an adult. It was from this team that he was selected to play for England, and he made his international debut and only appearance for England on 15 February 1875 in the match against England at The Oval, which England won.

References

1851 births
1915 deaths
English rugby union players
England international rugby union players
Rugby union forwards
People educated at Cheltenham College
Rugby union players from Shropshire
Sportspeople from Oswestry